Karaikudi Mani (born as Ganapathy Subramanyam on 11 September 1945 in Karaikudi, Tamil Nadu, India) is an Indian percussionist, primarily adept in the mridangam. He is regarded by the vast majority of Carnatic connoisseurs and aficionados as one of the greatest mridangam players ever.

Personal life
Karaikudi Mani was born on 11 September 1945 at Karaikudi, Tamil Nadu.  He is the son of T. Ramanatha Iyer and Pattammal. He became involved with Carnatic music at the age of three and soon abandoned his vocal training in favour of learning the mridangam.

Career
Mani began performing regularly at a time when another player of the mridangam, his idol Palghat Mani Iyer, was in his prime. He took further lessons under the tutelage of Harihara Sharma, after moving to Chennai and received his first national award at the age of 18 from the then President of India, Radhakrishnan. In a 2015 interview he claimed that receiving awards and titles has never been part of his agenda. In 1999 he accepted the national award from "Sangeeth Natak Academy". This was presented by the President of India at the time, K. R. Narayanan.

Sruthi Laya
In 1986, he started an ensemble, called Sruthi Laya, that combined melody and percussion. Three years later, he founded the Sruthi Laya Seva School that now has centres at Chennai, Bangalore, Australia, London, US, and Canada.

Thani Avarthanam – A Concept
He conducted and orchestrated several such concerts, notably a collaboration with Sri VS Narasimhan in 1990 presented Melodyssey, a project with 40 artistes, including Western and Indian Instruments. This won widespread appreciation and was released on tape.

His next endeavour, the concept of "Thani Avarthanam" concerts. Whilst Thala Vadya (Percussion ensemble) concerts in Carnatic music were not unheard of, the concept of just two percussion instruments performing solos without any other "sruthi" performers (e.g. vocal, violin) had never been attempted. In 1993, Karaikudi Mani presented his first Thani Avarthanam concert along with the late Kanjira wizard G Harishankar. This spellbinding performance is regarded a landmark moment in the classical percussion field. It has revolutionised the role of the mridangam, proving that as an art form, South Indian percussion instruments can be played as solo instruments in their own right. A concept initiated by Mani has since been undertaken by several leading mridangists who have also performed Thani Avarthanam concerts. Since then, Mani has conducted several "Thani Avarthanam" duet concerts featuring leading percussionists on Ghatam, Thavil, Chendai, etc.

International Collaboration
Guru Karaikudi Mani has performed with many international artists like Paul Grabowsky of Australian Art Orchestra, Eero Haemmeneimi of Finland Naada group, Elio Marchesini La Scala percussionist and Livio Magnini of Italy, Paul Simon of USA and with Finland Philharmonic Orchestra. A piece called Layapriya was performed with Finland Philharmonic Orchestra which was later performed by the Battery Dance Company as a dance ballet. The Australian Art Orchestra has adapted his Bahudari and Ranjani compositions into Jazz style and released it as "Into The Fire". The Naada group of Finland has converted the Behag composition into Jazz orchestrisation and released it as "UNMATCHED".  It is his greatness as a percussion maestro that made Eero Haemmeneimi dedicates 4 compositions in his name.

His latest venture titled "Amrutham – Fusion for Freedom" is an effort. Apart from that, he has also collaborated with Japanese musician John Kaizan Neptune to create an album named "Steps in Time". In this album, Guru Karaikudi Mani has created a unique synthesis of shakuhachi and Indian percussion.

In 2008, Mani collaborated with Sarangan Sriranganathan and other Australian musicians in a Classical/ Fusion concert called "Unity in Diversity".

In 2011, he played on Paul Simon's album So Beautiful or So What.

He founded a magazine called Layamani Layam.

References

1945 births
Living people
Tamil musicians
Mridangam players
Indian percussionists
Karaikudi
Recipients of the Sangeet Natak Akademi Award